Ilyocypris is a genus of ostracods belonging to the family Cyprididae.

The genus has cosmopolitan distribution.

Species:
 Ilyocypris alta Sars, 1910
 Ilyocypris arvadensis Swain

References

Ostracods